"Please (You Got That ...)" is a song by Australian rock band INXS, released as the second single from their ninth studio album, Full Moon, Dirty Hearts, on 29 November 1993. The song was written by Andrew Farriss and Michael Hutchence and features guest vocals by Ray Charles. In June 2019, a new version of the song was released as the second single from the 2019 documentary film Mystify and lifted from the soundtrack, Mystify: A Musical Journey with Michael Hutchence.

Background
When Ray Charles arrived to sing his part, Michael Hutchence was there in the studio to teach him how to produce the Hutchencesque vocal style. "Mr. Charles," Michael respectfully addressed him, "... it (the melody) goes like this ... (Michael sings the line and Ray Charles attempts to imitate it). After many attempts Charles says, "Sir (Michael), I know I will eventually get it right" ... and of course he did.

B-sides
The b-sides on the first of two UK CD single releases include a remix of "Please (You Got That ...)", an extended mix of "Freedom Deep" from the Full Moon, Dirty Hearts album and a live performance of "Communication" from Welcome to Wherever You Are, which was recorded in Santa Monica, California, on the Get Out of The House tour.

Track listings
CD1
 "Please (You Got That ...)"
 "Please (You Got That ...)" (main edit)
 "Freedom Deep" (extended 12-inch mix)
 "Communication" (live)

CD2 and 12-inch single
 "Please (You Got That ...)" (Club Need mix)
 "Please (You Got That ...)" (Needful dub mix)
 "Please (You Got That ...)" (Downtown dub mix)
 "Please (You Got That ...)" (Downtown instrumental mix)

Cassette single
 "Please (You Got That ...)"
 "Freedom Deep" (extended 12-inch mix)

Charts

References

1993 singles
1993 songs
2019 singles
Atlantic Records singles
INXS songs
Song recordings produced by Mark Opitz
Songs written by Andrew Farriss
Songs written by Michael Hutchence